Lajos Szikszai (November 25, 1825 – August 31, 1897) was a Hungarian revolutionary, politician, Member of Parliament, vicecomes of Szilágy County and art collector.

Szikszai was born in Szilágysámson (Șamșud) into a noble family. After 1840, he studied at the Calvinist high school in Zilah (Zalău). He was a participant at the Hungarian Revolution of 1848. From 1862 Szikszai worked as a lawyer. In 1875, he became a member of the National Assembly of Hungary and from 1883 he was the vicecomes of Szilágy County. In 1880, Lajos Szikszai donated his private collection to the municipality and the first museum in Zilah was created. In his last years, he initiated the construction of the Tuhutum Monument, once located in a park in Zalău named after Lajos Szikszai.

Honours 
 Şcoala Gimnazială "Szikszai Lajos"

References

External links 
  Petri Mór, SZIKSZAI LAJOS
  Un monument dispărut

Hungarian nobility
People from Sălaj County
Hungarian politicians
1825 births
1897 deaths